Charnwood Forest is a hilly tract in north-western Leicestershire, England, bounded by Leicester, Loughborough and Coalville. The area is undulating, rocky and picturesque, with barren areas. On its western flank lies an abandoned coalfield, with Coalville and other former mining villages, now being regenerated and replanted as part of the National Forest. The M1 motorway, between junctions 22 and 23, cuts through Charnwood Forest.

The hard stone of Charnwood Forest has been quarried for centuries, and was a source of whetstones and quern-stones. The granite quarries at Bardon Hill, Buddon Hill and Whitwick supply crushed aggregate to a wide area of southern Britain.

The forest is an important recreational area with woodland walks, noted for their displays of bluebells in the early spring, rock climbing and hillwalking. Popular places with public access include Bardon Hill, Beacon Hill, Bradgate Park, Swithland Wood and the Outwoods and Stoneywell Cottage (National Trust).

Extent
The area of hills and open land known as Charnwood Forest has no jurisdictional boundary (the Borough of Charnwood covers roughly two thirds of Charnwood Forest, and the eastern half of the borough is not part of the forest). Furthermore, despite its name, Charnwood was never a royal forest, and was never subject to forest law. So although it is an ancient and well-established locality, it has only recently been officially defined, by the Natural England National Character Area (NCA) process, which takes a somewhat wider definition than many previous attempts to define the area.

Geology
Many of the craggy rocks of Charnwood Forest are of volcanic origin and are very old, dating back through 600 million years to Precambrian times. It was the site of the first-ever recorded discovery of Charnia masoni, the earliest-known large, complex fossilised species on record, recovered from a quarry near the Charnwood village of Woodhouse Eaves. It was discovered separately in 1956 & 1957 by local schoolchildren Tina Negus and Roger Mason, although it was Mason who received the credit (thus masoni). Since this find in Charnwood Forest, Precambrian fossils have been discovered across the world.

Along the western edge of Charnwood Forest the rocks are mainly Precambrian igneous diorites. These formed from molten lava deep within the sedimentary rocks, cooling slowly to produce hard, blocky rock with large crystals. This is extensively quarried for roadstone around Groby, Markfield and Whitwick, and is known as granite (formerly also called Markfieldite).

The central area of the forest has older rocks still. These are sedimentary and are very variable in character, They were formed by material from volcanoes, settling in deep water, and it is in these beds that the fossils are found. Uplifting, tilting and erosion have produced the distinctive jagged exposures found across the highest parts of Charnwood. On the eastern side, a much more recent series of rocks are found. Again igneous diorites, that formed deep underground, but these are Ordovician, from a mere 450 million years ago. These are extensively quarried in the areas near Mountsorrel.

History
The earliest form of the name Charnwood is probably derived from cerne woda, from the Celtic carn, meaning cairn, and the Old English wudu, meaning wood. Some sources give cwern as the derivation, meaning a tool used to grind grain and other materials by hand. The area was a source of stone for these tools, called quern-stones.

Archeological evidence has shown that the area was inhabited as far back as the Neolithic period, approximately 4,000–2,000 BC. Beacon Hill is the site of a Bronze Age hill fort, dating from between 600 BC and 43 AD. This forms one of the last surviving visible features in the landscape known to the Coritani, the tribe who occupied most of the East Midlands area at the time of the Roman Conquest.

According to Domesday Book, there was only one settlement in Charnwood Forest in 1086, at Charley whose name would appear to come from the same root, with the suffix -ley denoting open land, rather than forest.

In the 200 years after the Norman conquest, newly created settlements took major areas of land out of the forest for use in agriculture. Quorn was established between 1086 and 1153, and all the land up to Woodhouse had been deforested by 1228.

There were comparatively few major changes in land use in the post Medieval period, until the demand for timber and charcoal for the early Industrial Revolution contributed to a further loss of woodland. By the end of the 18th century, most of the woodland had disappeared leaving large areas of moorland and pasture.

In 1957 Charnwood Forest was considered for designation as an Area of Outstanding Natural Beauty (AONB), but the designation was not made due to the construction of the M1 motorway through the area.

In literature
The area was the inspiration for "Charnwood Poems", a collection of poems by the author, playwright and poet Albert Francis Cross (1863–1940). It is also the setting for the speculative fiction novel Some Kind of Fairy Tale by Graham Joyce (2012), in which it is depicted as a possible portal to the realm of fairies.

Wildlife and geological sites

Charnwood Forest covers approx  of Leicestershire, split over three local government districts: Charnwood Borough, North West Leicestershire District and Hinckley and Bosworth District. It includes a national nature reserve (NNR), 19 SSSIs (Some subdivided in the list of sites below), 4 Geological Conservation Review (GCR) sites of international geological importance plus a further 6 GCR sites, 13 regionally important geological sites (RIGS), five local nature reserves (LNRs), seven Leicestershire and Rutland Wildlife Trust (LRWT) nature reserves, and one Woodland Trust woodland. Seventeen sites have open access to the public. Footpaths and bridleways give views and limited access to the other sites listed, and to the rest of the Charnwood Forest landscape. Over half of Charnwood Forest is included within the English National Forest. It is also crossed by two waymarked long distance walking routes—the Leicestershire Round and the Ivanhoe Way. The 45 sites listed here include sites with statutory wildlife or geological designations, plus other sites included in published lists of notable sites. On both the map and table, green denotes a site open to the public, amber denotes a site with limited access or restricted by permit or membership. Red denotes a site with no public access except by special arrangement with the owners.

Plants found within the woods include Digitalis purpurea, Dactylorhiza fuchsii, Sorbus torminalis and Vaccinium myrtilus.

Abbreviations used in the table:
National nature reserve (NNR). Site of Special Scientific Interest (SSSI) (B=Biological, G=Geological). Geological Conservation Review (GCR)(I=of International importance). Regionally Important Geological Site (RIGS). Leicestershire and Rutland Wildlife Trust (LRWT). National Trust (NT). Local nature reserve (LNR).

See also
 Henry Walter Bates
 Thomas George Bonney
Borough of Charnwood
 Quorn Hunt
 Charnia

Notes

References
 
 
 
  (This report includes two high-quality geological maps)

External links
 Charnwood forest geology.
 Beacon Hill Country Park

Forests and woodlands of Leicestershire
Hills of Leicestershire
Borough of Charnwood